The La Gorce Mountains are a group of mountains, spanning , standing between the tributary Robison Glacier and Klein Glacier at the east side of the upper reaches of the Scott Glacier, in the Queen Maud Mountains of Antarctica. They were discovered in December 1934 by the Byrd Antarctic Expedition geological party under Quin Blackburn, and named by Richard E. Byrd for John Oliver La Gorce, Vice President of the National Geographic Society.

Features
Geographical features include:

 Ackerman Ridge
 Beard Peak
 Delta Peak
 Gjertsen Promontory
 Goldstream Peak
 Graves Nunataks
 Hourglass Buttress
 Johansen Peak
 Kessens Peak
 Klein Glacier
 Mount Gjertsen
 Mount Grier
 Mount Mooney
 Mount Paine
 Robison Glacier
 Scott Glacier
 Surprise Spur
 Waterhouse Spur

References

Queen Maud Mountains